Bathyphlebia is a genus of moths of the family Saturniidae. The genus was erected by Cajetan Felder in 1874.

Species
Bathyphlebia aglia R. Felder & Rogenhofer, 1874 — Colombia
Bathyphlebia eminens (Dognin, 1891) — Ecuador
Bathyphlebia eminentoides Brechlin & Meister, 2009
Bathyphlebia johnsoni Oiticica & Michener, 1950
Bathyphlebia rufescens Oiticica & Michener, 1950

References

Ceratocampinae